The 2015–16 Indiana Pacers season was Indiana's 49th season as a franchise and 40th season in the NBA.

With a healthy Paul George returning to form, the Pacers clinched a playoff spot after defeating the Brooklyn Nets on April 10. The victory eliminated the Chicago Bulls from playoff contention. The Pacers finished the regular season with a record of 45–37, which would earn them the seventh seed in the East. They would be matched up against the second seeded Toronto Raptors in the first round but in the end would be eliminated in a decisive seven-game series.

2015 NBA draft

Roster

Standing

Game log

Preseason

|- style="background:#fbb;"
| 1
| October 3
| New Orleans
| 105–110
| Paul George (18)
| Lavoy Allen (8)
| Robinson III, Stuckey (4)
| Bankers Life Fieldhouse13,725
| 0–1
|- style="background:#bfb;"
| 2
| October 6
| @ Detroit
| 115–112
| Paul George (32)
| Shayne Whittington (8)
| George Hill (8)
| The Palace of Auburn Hills10,446
| 1–1
|- style="background:#bfb;"
| 3
| October 9
| Orlando
| 97–92
| Miles, Robinson (14)
| Ian Mahinmi (9)
| Monta Ellis (7)
| Amway Center13,475
| 2–1
|- style="background:#bfb;"
| 4
| October 13
| Detroit
| 101–97
| Toney Douglas (15)
| Lavoy Allen (6)
| Toney Douglas (3)
| Bankers Life Fieldhouse12,730
| 3–1
|- style="background:#bfb;"
| 5
| October 15
| @ Cleveland
| 107–85
| Paul George (17)
| Paul George (8)
| Joe Young (6)
| Quicken Loans Arena18,774
| 4–1
|- style="background:#fbb;"
| 6
| October 20
| @ Chicago
| 94–103
| Paul George (26)
| Paul George (13)
| Ellis, Hill, Stuckey (3)
| United Center21,512
| 4–2
|- style="background:#bfb;"
| 7
| October 22
| Charlotte
| 98–86
| C. J. Miles (20)
| Lavoy Allen (10)
| George Hill (5)
| Allen County War Memorial Coliseum10,744
| 5–2

Regular season game log

|- style="background:#fbb;"
| 1
| October 28
| @ Toronto
| 
| George Hill (19)
| Paul George (12)
| Paul George (8)
| Air Canada Centre19,800
| 0–1
|- style="background:#fbb;"
| 2
| October 29
| Memphis
| 
| George Hill (20)
| Ian Mahinmi (9)
| George, Stuckey (5)
| Bankers Life Fieldhouse18,165
| 0–2
|- style="background:#fbb;"
| 3
| October 31
| Utah
| 
| George Hill (17)
| George Hill (6)
| Monta Ellis (3)
| Bankers Life Fieldhouse14,412
| 0–3

|- style="background:#bfb;"
| 4
| November 3
| @ Detroit
| 
| Rodney Stuckey (23)
| Paul George (9)
| George, Hill (6)
| The Palace of Auburn Hills14,412
| 1–3
|- style="background:#bfb;"
| 5
| November 4
| Boston
| 
| Paul George (26)
| Lavoy Allen (11)
| Monta Ellis (8)
| Bankers Life Fieldhouse14,022
| 2–3
|- style="background:#bfb;"
| 6
| November 6
| Miami
| 
| Paul George (36)
| Paul George (12)
| Monta Ellis (8)
| Bankers Life Fieldhouse16,914
| 3–3
|- style="background:#fbb;"
| 7
| November 8
| @ Cleveland
| 
| Paul George (32)
| George, Hill (11)
| Paul George (6)
| Quicken Loans Arena20,562
| 3–4
|- style="background:#bfb;"
| 8
| November 9
| Orlando
| 
| Paul George (27)
| Ian Mahinmi (9)
| Paul George (7)
| Bankers Life Fieldhouse13,104
| 4–4
|- style="background:#bfb;"
| 9
| November 11
| @ Boston
| 
| Paul George (26)
| Paul George (10)
| Monta Ellis (6)
| TD Garden17,879
| 5–4
|- style="background:#bfb;"
| 10
| November 13
| Minnesota
| 
| Paul George (29)
| George, Mahinmi (9)
| Ellis, Budinger (5)
| Bankers Life Fieldhouse16,797
| 6–4
|- style="background:#fbb;"
| 11
| November 16
| @ Chicago
| 
| Paul George (26)
| Ian Mahinmi (12)
| Monta Ellis (6)
| United Center21,660
| 6–5
|- style="background:#bfb;"
| 12
| November 18
| @ Philadelphia
| 
| Paul George (34)
| Paul George (8)
| Monta Ellis (9)
| Wells Fargo Center11,080
| 7–5
|- style="background:#bfb;"
| 13
| November 21
| Milwaukee
| 
| C. J. Miles (21)
| Jordan Hill (11)
| Paul George (7)
| Bankers Life Fieldhouse17,137
| 8–5
|- style="background:#bfb;"
| 14
| November 24
| @ Washington
| 
| Paul George (40)
| Ian Mahinmi (9)
| Ellis, Hill (5)
| Verizon Center15,486
| 9–5
|- style="background:#bfb;"
| 15
| November 27
| Chicago
| 
| Paul George (33)
| George Hill (10)
| Monta Ellis (5)
| Bankers Life Fieldhouse18,165
| 10–5
|- style="background:#bfb;"
| 16
| November 29
| @ L. A. Lakers
| 
| Paul George (39)
| Hill, Mahinmi (10)
| Monta Ellis (6)
| STAPLES Center18,997
| 11–5

|- style="background:#bfb;"
| 17
| December 2
| @ L. A. Clippers
| 
| Paul George (31)
| Paul George (10)
| Paul George (4)
| STAPLES Center19,060
| 12–5
|- style="background:#fbb;"
| 18
| December 3
| @ Portland
| 
| C. J. Miles (27)
| Ian Mahinmi (11)
| Rodney Stuckey (6)
| Moda Center19,060
| 12–6
|- style="background:#fbb;"
| 19
| December 5
| @ Utah
| 
| Paul George (48)
| Allen, George, Hill (8)
| George Hill (5)
| Vivint Smart Home Arena19,500
| 12–7
|- style="background:#fbb;"
| 20
| December 8
| Golden State
| 
| Paul George (33)
| Solomon Hill (9)
| Paul George (6)
| Bankers Life Fieldhouse18,165
| 12–8
|- style="background:#bfb;"
| 21
| December 11
| Miami
| 
| Paul George (23)
| Ian Mahinmi (12)
| Monta Ellis (6)
| Bankers Life Fieldhouse16,184
| 13–8
|- style="background:#fbb;"
| 22
| December 12
| @ Detroit
| 
| George Hill (14)
| George Hill (7)
| George Hill (8)
| The Palace of Auburn Hills14,858
| 13–9
|- style="background:#bfb;"
| 23
| December 14
| Toronto
| 
| Jordan Hill (20)
| Jordan Hill (13)
| Lavoy Allen (4)
| Bankers Life Fieldhouse16,598
| 14–9
|- style="background:#bfb;"
| 24
| December 16
| Dallas
| 
| C. J. Miles (20)
| Ian Mahinmi (10)
| Rodney Stuckey (7)
| Bankers Life Fieldhouse14,824
| 15–9
|- style="background:#bfb;"
| 25
| December 18
| Brooklyn
| 
| Paul George (23)
| Jordan Hill (11)
| Monta Ellis (5)
| Bankers Life Fieldhouse16,548
| 16–9
|- style="background:#fbb;"
| 26
| December 19
| @ Memphis
| 
| Paul George (29)
| Jordan Hill (13)
| Allen, George, Hill, Stuckey (2)
| FedExForum18,119
| 16–10
|- style="background:#fbb;"
| 27
| December 21
| @ San Antonio
| 
| Rodney Stuckey (16)
| Ian Mahinmi (11)
| Ellis, George (6)
| AT&T Center18,418
| 16–11
|- style="background:#fbb;"
| 28
| December 23
| Sacramento
| 
| Monta Ellis (21)
| Paul George (10)
| Monta Ellis (6)
| Bankers Life Fieldhouse18,165
| 16–12
|- style="background:#bfb;"
| 29
| December 26
| @ Minnesota
| 
| Monta Ellis (22)
| Ian Mahinmi (6)
| Rodney Stuckey (8)
| Target Center15,076
| 17–12
|-style="background:#bfb;"
| 30
| December 28
| Atlanta
| 
| Monta Ellis (26)
| Ian Mahinmi (9)
| Paul George (3)
| Bankers Life Fieldhouse18,165
| 18–12
|-style="background:#fbb;"
| 31
| December 30
| @ Chicago
| 
| Jordan Hill (20)
| Lavoy Allen (12)
| Monta Ellis (5)
| United Center22,206
| 18–13
|-style="background:#fbb;"
| 32
| December 31
| Milwaukee
| 
| Paul George (31)
| Myles Turner (9)
| Monta Ellis (7)
| Bankers Life Fieldhouse16,348
| 18–14

|-style="background:#bfb;"
| 33
| January 2
| Detroit
| 
| Paul George (32)
| Paul George (14)
| Ellis, George (3)
| Bankers Life Fieldhouse18,165
| 19–14
|-style="background:#fbb;"
| 34
| January 4
| @ Miami
| 
| Paul George (32)
| Jordan Hill (12)
| Monta Ellis (9)
| American Airlines Arena19,874
| 19–15
|- style="background:#bfb;"
| 35
| January 6
| @ Orlando
| 
| Paul George (20)
| Ian Mahinmi (12)
| Monta Ellis (7)
| Amway Center18,846
| 20–15
|- style="background:#bfb;"
| 36
| January 8
| @ New Orleans
| 
| Ian Mahinmi (17)
| Ian Mahinmi (10)
| Monta Ellis (8)
| CenturyLink Center16,895
| 21–15
|- style="background:#fbb;"
| 37
| January 10
| @ Houston
| 
| Paul George (20)
| Ian Mahinmi (7)
| Monta Ellis (13)
| Toyota Center18,133
| 21–16
|- style="background:#bfb;"
| 38
| January 12
| Phoenix
| 
| Paul George (21)
| C. J. Miles (8)
| Monta Ellis (7)
| Bankers Life Fieldhouse15,284
| 22–16
|- style="background:#fbb;"
| 39
| January 13
| @ Boston
| 
| Paul George (23)
| Ian Mahinmi (10)
| Ellis, George (4)
| TD Garden18,624
| 22–17
|- style="background:#fbb;"
| 40
| January 15
| Washington
| 
| Paul George (21)
| George Hill (8)
| Paul George (7)
| Bankers Life Fieldhouse18,165
| 22–18
|- style="background:#fbb;"
| 41
| January 17
| @ Denver
| 
| Myles Turner (25)
| Myles Turner (7)
| Joe Young (7)
| Pepsi Center11,104
| 22–19
|- style="background:#bfb;"
| 42
| January 19
| @ Phoenix
| 
| Monta Ellis (20)
| Paul George (8)
| Joe Young (5)
| Talking Stick Resort Arena16,802
| 23–19
|-style="background:#fbb;"
| 43
| January 22
| @ Golden State
| 
| Myles Turner (31)
| Myles Turner (8)
| Joe Young (8)
| Oracle Arena19,596
| 23–20
|-style="background:#fbb;"
| 44
| January 23
| Sacramento
| 
| Paul George (34)
| Jordan Hill (13)
| Monta Ellis (7)
| Sleep Train Arena17,419
| 23–21
|- style="background:#fbb;"
| 45
| January 26
| L. A. Clippers
| 
| Paul George (31)
| Paul George (11)
| Monta Ellis (5)
| Bankers Life Fieldhouse15,448
| 23–22
|- style="background:#bfb;"
| 46
| January 28
| Atlanta
| 
| Monta Ellis (25)
| Lavoy Allen (12)
| Monta Ellis (6)
| Bankers Life Fieldhouse15,196
| 24–22
|- style="background:#bfb;"
| 47
| January 30
| Denver
| 
| Monta Ellis (32)
| Myles Turner (9)
| Paul George (7)
| Bankers Life Fieldhouse18,165
| 25–22

|- style="background:#fbb;"
| 48
| February 1
| Cleveland
| 
| George Hill (23)
| Myles Turner (10)
| Paul George (8)
| Bankers Life Fieldhouse17,283
| 25–23
|- style="background:#bfb;"
| 49
| February 3
| @ Brooklyn
| 
| C. J. Miles (27)
| Lavoy Allen (8)
| Paul George (6)
| Barclays Center13,311
| 26–23
|- style="background:#fbb;"
| 50
| February 5
| @ Atlanta
| 
| Paul George (31)
| Lavoy Allen (14)
| George Hill (8)
| Philips Arena17,225
| 26–24
|- style="background:#bfb;"
| 51
| February 6
| Detroit
| 
| Paul George (30)
| George, Hill (8)
| Monta Ellis (5)
| Bankers Life Fieldhouse18,165
| 27–24
|- style="background:#bfb;"
| 52
| February 8
| L. A. Lakers
| 
| Paul George (21)
| Myles Turner (13)
| George Hill (6)
| Bankers Life Fieldhouse18,165
| 28–24
|- style="background:#fbb;"
| 53
| February 10
| Charlotte
| 
| Paul George (22)
| George, Mahinmi (8)
| Paul George (6)
| Bankers Life Fieldhouse15,653
| 28–25
|- align="center"
|colspan="9" bgcolor="#bbcaff"|All-Star Break
|- style="background:#bfb;"
| 54
| February 19
| @ Oklahoma City
| 
| Monta Ellis (27)
| Hill, Mahinmi (11)
| George Hill (9)
| Chesapeake Energy Arena18,203
| 29–25
|- style="background:#bfb;"
| 55
| February 21
| @ Orlando
| 
| Monta Ellis (21)
| Ian Mahinmi (9)
| George Hill (7)
| Amway Center17,242
| 30–25
|- style="background:#fbb;"
| 56
| February 22
| @ Miami
| 
| Paul George (31)
| Paul George (11)
| Paul George (4)
| American Airlines Arena19,600
| 30–26
|- style="background:#bfb;"
| 57
| February 24
| New York
| 
| Paul George (27)
| Monta Ellis (8)
| Monta Ellis (7)
| Bankers Life Fieldhouse16,018
| 31–26
|-style="background:#fbb;"
| 58
| February 26
| Charlotte
| 
| Paul George (32)
| Ian Mahinmi (9)
| George Hill (7)
| Bankers Life Fieldhouse18,165
| 31–27
|-style="background:#fbb;"
| 59
| February 28
| Portland
| 
| Monta Ellis (18)
| Myles Turner (8)
| Ellis, Hill (5)
| Bankers Life Fieldhouse16,662
| 31–28
|- style="background:#fbb;"
| 60
| February 29
| @ Cleveland
| 
| Monta Ellis (28)
| Paul George (8)
| George, Stuckey (6)
| Quicken Loans Arena20,562
| 31–29

|- style="background:#bfb;"
| 61
| March 2
| @ Milwaukee
| 
| George Hill (19)
| Paul George (10)
| Monta Ellis (6)
| BMO Harris Bradley Center14,263
| 32–29
|- style="background:#fbb;"
| 62
| March 4
| @ Charlotte
| 
| Paul George (35)
| Ian Mahinmi (14)
| Paul George (7)
| Time Warner Cable Arena19,099
| 32–30
|- style="background:#bfb;"
| 63
| March 5
| @ Washington
| 
| Paul George (38)
| Jordan Hill (9)
| George Hill (5)
| Verizon Center20,356
| 33–30
|-style="background:#bfb;"
| 64
| March 7
| San Antonio
| 
| Monta Ellis (26)
| Hill, Turner (10)
| George Hill (5)
| Bankers Life Fieldhouse16,742
| 34–30
|-style="background:#bfb;"
| 65
| March 12
| @ Dallas
| 
| Paul George (20)
| Paul George (10)
| Monta Ellis (7)
| American Airlines Center20,459
| 35–30
|-style="background:#fbb;"
| 66
| March 13
| @ Atlanta
| 
| Myles Turner (19)
| Ian Mahinmi (7)
| Paul George (6)
| Philips Arena17,066
| 35–31
|-style="background:#bfb;"
| 67
| March 15
| Boston
| 
| Paul George (26)
| Allen, Ellis, George (7)
| Monta Ellis (6)
| Bankers Life Fieldhouse17,118
| 36–31
|- style="background:#fbb;"
| 68
| March 17
| Toronto
| 
| George, Hill (18)
| George, Turner (9)
| Monta Ellis (7)
| Bankers Life Fieldhouse15,104
| 36–32
|- style="background:#fbb;"
| 69
| March 19
| Oklahoma City
| 
| Paul George (45)
| Myles Turner (8)
| George Hill (9)
| Bankers Life Fieldhouse18,165
| 36–33
|- style="background:#bfb;"
| 70
| March 21
| Philadelphia
| 
| Paul George (15)
| Ian Mahinmi (10)
| Monta Ellis (5)
| Bankers Life Fieldhouse16,155
| 37–33
|- style="background:#bfb;"
| 71
| March 24
| New Orleans
| 
| Myles Turner (24)
| Myles Turner (16)
| George Hill (8)
| Bankers Life Fieldhouse17,517
| 38–33
|- style="background:#fbb;"
| 72
| March 26
| @ Brooklyn
| 
| Paul George (27)
| Jordan Hill (6)
| Monta Ellis (6)
| Barclays Center16,625
| 38–34
|- style="background:#bfb;"
| 73
| March 27
| Houston
| 
| Paul George (25)
| George, Mahinmi (11)
| Monta Ellis (7)
| Bankers Life Fieldhouse17,165
| 39–34
|-style="background:#fbb;"
| 74
| March 29
| Chicago
| 
| Paul George (20)
| Paul George (9)
| Paul George (5)
| Bankers Life Fieldhouse17,050
| 39–35
|- style="background:#fbb;"
| 75
| March 31
| Orlando
| 
| Paul George (27)
| Lavoy Allen (11)
| Ian Mahinmi (3)
| Bankers Life Fieldhouse17,234
| 39–36

|- style="background:#bfb;"
| 76
| April 2
| @ Philadelphia
| 
| C. J. Miles (25)
| Ian Mahinmi (12)
| Paul George (7)
| Wells Fargo Center19,213
| 40–36
|- style="background:#bfb;"
| 77
| April 3
| @ New York
| 
| Paul George (20)
| Paul George (9)
| Ty Lawson (5)
| Madison Square Garden19,812
| 41–36
|- style="background:#bfb;"
| 78
| April 6
| Cleveland
| 
| Paul George (29)
| Ian Mahinmi (8)
| Monta Ellis (8)
| Bankers Life Fieldhouse18,165
| 42–36
|- style="background:#fbb;"
| 79
| April 8
| @ Toronto
| 
| Monta Ellis (17)
| Lavoy Allen (8)
| Ty Lawson (5)
| Air Canada Centre19,800
| 42–37
|- style="background:#bfb;"
| 80
| April 10
| Brooklyn
| 
| Myles Turner (28)
| Solomon Hill (12)
| Ty Lawson (9)
| Bankers Life Fieldhouse18,165
| 43–37
|- style="background:#bfb;"
| 81
| April 12
| New York
| 
| George, Hill (19)
| Solomon Hill (11)
| Ty Lawson (8)
| Bankers Life Fieldhouse17,906
| 44–37
|- style="background:#bfb;"
| 82
| April 13
| @ Milwaukee
| 
| Solomon Hill (25)
| Jordan Hill (11)
| Joe Young (7)
| BMO Harris Bradley Center16,569
| 45–37

Playoffs

Game log

|- style="background:#bfb;"
| 1
| April 16
| @ Toronto
| 
| Paul George (33)
| Allen, Miles (7)
| Paul George (6)
| Air Canada Centre19,800
| 1–0
|- style="background:#fbb;"
| 2
| April 18
| @ Toronto
| 
| Paul George (28)
| Solomon Hill (6)
| Ellis, Lawson (3)
| Air Canada Centre19,800
| 1–1
|- style="background:#fbb;"
| 3
| April 21
| Toronto
| 
| Paul George (25)
| Paul George (10)
| Paul George (6)
| Bankers Life Fieldhouse18,165
| 1–2
|- style="background:#bfb;"
| 4
| April 23
| Toronto
| 
| Hill, Mahinmi (22)
| Ian Mahinmi (10)
| Ian Mahinmi (5)
| Bankers Life Fieldhouse18,165
| 2–2
|- style="background:#fbb;"
| 5
| April 26
| @ Toronto
| 
| Paul George (39)
| George, Turner (10)
| Paul George (8)
| Air Canada Centre19,800
| 2–3
|- style="background:#bfb;"
| 6
| April 29
| Toronto
| 
| Paul George (21)
| Paul George (11)
| Paul George (6)
| Bankers Life Fieldhouse18,165
| 3–3
|- style="background:#fbb;"
| 7
| May 1
| @ Toronto
| 
| Paul George (26)
| Paul George (12)
| Monta Ellis (7)
| Air Canada Centre19,800
| 3–4

Player statistics

Regular season

Playoffs

Player Statistics Citation:

Transactions

Trades

Free agents

Re-signed

Additions

Subtractions

References

Indiana Pacers seasons
Indiana Pacers
Indiana Pacers
Indiana Pacers